The Diocese of Mindelo is a Latin Church ecclesiastical territory or diocese of the Catholic Church in Cabo Verde. Its cathedral is Catedral Nossa Senhora da Luz in the episcopal see of Mindelo. The diocese is immediately exempt to the Holy See and not part of any ecclesiastical province.

History
 December 19, 2003: Established as Diocese of Mindelo from the Diocese of Santiago de Cabo Verde

Bishops
Arlindo Gomes Furtado (2004–2009), appointed Bishop of Santiago de Cabo Verde (Cardinal in 2015)
Ildo Augusto Dos Santos Lopes Fortes (since January 25, 2011)

See also
Roman Catholicism in Cape Verde

Sources
 GCatholic.org
 Catholic Hierarchy

Roman Catholic dioceses in Cape Verde
Christian organizations established in 2003
Mindelo
Roman Catholic dioceses and prelatures established in the 21st century
Roman Catholic bishops of Mindelo